Arneštovice is a municipality and village in Pelhřimov District in the Vysočina Region of the Czech Republic. It has about 90 inhabitants.

References

Villages in Pelhřimov District